Gongora maculata is a species of orchid found in Trinidad, Guyana and Peru.

References

maculata
Orchids of Guyana
Orchids of Peru
Orchids of Trinidad